The Institute of Asian and African Countries at Lomonosov Moscow State University was founded in 1956 as the Institute of Oriental Languages and was renamed to the Institute of Asian and African Countries in 1972. It is a Russian Centre for Oriental Studies. It employs more than 250 members including 28 professors and 70 assistant professors. Many of them are authors of studies, text-books and dictionaries for their translations of Japanese, Chinese, Sanskrit, Arabic, Hindi, Persian, Malay, Swahili and other Asian and African texts of fiction. Nowadays many Asian and African languages are taught in the Institute including Chinese, Japanese, Korean, Vietnamese, Thai, Mongolian, Arabic, Sinhalese, Turkish, Hebrew, Urdu, Sanskrit, Swahili, Hausa, Amharic, Afrikaans, Fula and Zulu.

The graduates of the Institute get a diploma in "Oriental and African Studies" with a specialization in philology, political science, history or economics. The staff of the Institute has worked out the syllabus and text books on History of Asian and African countries and on Oriental Literature as well as books on languages, history, ethnology, geography and economics of the certain regions. More than 40 oriental and West-European languages are being taught at the Institute.

Directors 
 Smirnov N.A. (1956–1958)
 Kovalev A. A. (1958–1975)
 Akhramovich R. T. (1975–1989)
 Meliksetov A. V. (1989–1994)
 Meier M. S. (1994–2012)
Acting director: Abylgaziev I.I. (2013–present)

Notable alumni
 Boris Akunin
 Dmitry Peskov
 Vladimir Zhirinovsky
 Yuri Bezmenov
 Igor Morgulov

References

External links
 Institute of Asian and African Studies
 https://web.archive.org/web/20081015022023/http://www.iaas.msu.ru/index_en.html

Asian studies
Moscow State University
African studies
Education in Moscow
Education in the Soviet Union
Universities and institutes established in the Soviet Union
1956 establishments in the Soviet Union
Research institutes in the Soviet Union